The Premier Range is a group of mountains within the Cariboo Mountains of east-central British Columbia, Canada. The range (also known as the Premier Group) is bounded by the Raush River and Kiwa Creek to the north, the North Thompson River on the south and west and the Fraser River and its tributaries to the east.

In 1927, the year of Canada's Diamond Jubilee, it was decided that the names of the higher peaks in this range would be reserved to pay tribute to prime ministers of Canada, prime ministers of the United Kingdom, and premiers of the province of British Columbia. In practice, however, only one British prime minister and one British Columbia premier have been so honoured, and recent changes to Canadian geographic naming regulations make it unlikely that any British prime minister or other non-Canadian will receive such an honour in the future.

The named summits of the Premier Range are, in order of elevation:

Before the Premier Range was selected, many mountains outside this area were named after Canadian prime ministers. Mount Mackenzie, Mount Tupper, Mount Macdonald and Mount Laurier rise over the Canadian Pacific Railway tracks that travel through the Rogers Pass near Golden, British Columbia. Mount Robert in the Coast Mountains of British Columbia honours Sir Robert Borden. There is also a Mount John Diefenbaker in British Columbia named after John Diefenbaker. Other than Laurier (who was also honoured with the name of a mountain in Yukon), none of these prime ministers have received the honour of also having a mountain named for them in the Premier Range.

See also
 Mica Mountain

References

External links
Canadian Mountain Encyclopedia on the Premier Range
Place Names in the Canadian Rockies
Mountains of Canada from Canadian Geographic

Cariboo Mountains
Robson Valley